is the Forbes family estate at Saint-Briac, France, and the international family seat of the descendants of James Grant Forbes (b. He is the grandfather of two famous politicians, Brice Lalonde, a Green Party candidate for President of France in 1981, and former US Secretary of State John Forbes Kerry, the Democratic nominee for President of the United States of America in 2004.

 had been occupied and used as a Nazi headquarters during World War II. When the Germans fled, they bombed  and burnt it down. The sprawling estate was rebuilt in 1954.

References 

Forbes family residences
Buildings and structures in Ille-et-Vilaine
Houses in France